I motorizzati is a 1962 Italian anthology comedy film directed by Camillo Mastrocinque, consisting of five segments all sharing cars as main theme.

Cast 

Ugo Tognazzi  as Achille Pestani
Nino Manfredi  as Nino Borsetti
Franco Franchi  as Thief
Ciccio Ingrassia  as Thief
Walter Chiari  as Valentino
Franca Valeri  as Velia
Aroldo Tieri  as Dino
Alberto Bonucci  as Mario Bianchi
Franca Tamantini  as Giovanna 
Dolores Palumbo  as Nino's Mother-in-law 
Gianni Agus as Mario
Marcella Rovena  as Maria Grazia
Mac Ronay as the traffic policeman
Luigi Pavese  as Nino's Boss
Gina Rovere  as Elisa
Mario Pisu  as Angelo
Mimmo Poli  as Vittorio
Mario Brega  as Edoardo
Mercedes Alonso as Claudia
Loredana Nusciak  as Paola

Release
I motorizzati was distributed theatrically in Italy by Unidis on 29 November 1962. It grossed a total of 735,681,000 lire domestically. It was released in Spain as Los motorizados on 10 February 1964.

References

Footnotes

Sources

External links

1962 films
Italian comedy films
1962 comedy films
Commedia all'italiana
Films directed by Camillo Mastrocinque
Films set in Rome
1960s Italian films